Edmund Chaderton was Archdeacon of Salisbury, Archdeacon of Totnes during 1491 and Archdeacon of Chester from 1493.

References

Archdeacons of Chester
Archdeacons of Salisbury
Archdeacons of Totnes
Masters of the Jewel Office